George Richard Perrett (2 May 1915 – 8 September 1952) was an English professional footballer. He made over 100 appearances for Ipswich Town between 1936 and 1950. He was born in London.

External links 
George Perrett at Pride of Anglia

1915 births
Footballers from Lambeth
1952 deaths
Association football defenders
Fulham F.C. players
Ipswich Town F.C. players
English footballers